Tai Shan (also known as Butterstick after birth and before naming) is a giant panda born at the National Zoo in Washington D.C. on July 9, 2005. He is the first panda cub born at the National Zoo to survive for more than a few days. He is the oldest brother of Bao Bao, Bei Bei and Xiao Qi Ji.

Lineage

Tai Shan is the first cub born on July 9, 2005 at 3:41 AM to Mei Xiang and Tian Tian, the National Zoo's second pair of giant pandas. (The first pair, Ling-Ling (female) and Hsing-Hsing (male), were donated to the United States by China in 1972, shortly after Richard Nixon's historic visit. Ling-Ling died in 1992 and Hsing-Hsing in 1999 without producing any cubs that survived for more than a few days.)

Both of Tai Shan's parents were born at the China Research and Conservation Center for the Giant Panda in Wolong, Sichuan Province.  Mei Xiang, his mother, was artificially inseminated in March 2005 with sperm from Tian Tian after natural mating between the pair appeared unsuccessful.  Per the agreement with China, the Chinese government can require that Tai Shan be sent to China any time after he reaches the age of two as he, like his parents, is the property of China. (Mei Xiang and Tian Tian are technically being "leased" to the National Zoo by the Chinese government in a ten-year, $10 million agreement, with the money to go to panda conservation research in China.) The National Zoo announced in April 2007 that it reached an agreement with the Chinese government to let Tai Shan remain at the National Zoo until at least July 2009. The announcement was made when Chinese Ambassador Zhou Wenzhong presented Tai Shan a "passport" with an extended stay period to July 2009, without extra charge.

Naming

Following a Chinese tradition, panda cubs are not named until they are 100 days old. Before he got a name, the cub was popularly referred to as Butterstick because immediately after his birth, a zoo worker described him as being about the size of a stick of butter.  The name caught on with bloggers, and became quite popular.

In fall 2005, the National Zoo announced that the cub's name would be chosen through an Internet poll. There were five names included on the poll; all were traditional Chinese names approved by the China Wildlife Conservation Association. The choices were Hua Sheng ("China Washington" and "magnificent"), Sheng Hua ("Washington China" and "magnificent"), Tai Shan ("peaceful mountain"), Long Shan ("dragon mountain"), and Qiang Qiang ("strong, powerful"). "Butterstick" was not included as an option. Some bloggers protested this decision; there was even an attempt to hack the poll, allowing voters the option of selecting the name Butterstick. Despite these efforts, the name Tai Shan was eventually chosen, as it had won 44 percent of the 202,045 total votes cast.

Media attention

Tai Shan made his public debut on December 8, 2005, after the National Zoo issued 13,000 free timed entry tickets.  These tickets were gone within 2 hours, and some were quickly offered for sale on eBay and craigslist, with an asking price as high as $500 apiece.

The cub became widely popular; he was frequently mentioned on D.C.-oriented websites, such as DCist and Wonkette, as well as traditional media outlets, including National Public Radio, The Washingtonian, The Washington Post, and The Washington Times.  Fans set up sites selling cub-related merchandise, including one partnered with cafepress.com that donated approximately $1,900 in profits to the National Zoo.

The panda cub was featured in an Animal Planet documentary titled A Panda Is Born, which follows the National Zoo's giant panda breeding efforts and Tai Shan's birth. A few months after Tai Shan's first birthday, Animal Planet premiered a documentary titled Baby Panda's First Year, which followed him during his first 12 months at the National  Zoo.

First birthday
At the National Zoo in Washington D.C., Tai Shan and thousands of fans celebrated his first birthday on July 9, 2006. As early as 7 a.m., National Zoo visitors started to line up outside the panda exhibit, with the opening three hours away.

One of his gifts was a giant custom-made fruitsicle with the number "1" on top. Such ice treats gave Tai Shan some gastrointestinal problems which he has now recovered from.

After 2007, Tai Shan lived on his own at the zoo, because cubs leave their mothers at about 2 years of age and fathers play no role in cub rearing.

Move to China

The National Zoo announced on Dec. 4, 2009, that Tai Shan would leave the zoo and be sent to China, in accordance with previous agreements. Zoo officials had asked for Tai Shan to remain in Washington for another year, but China declined the request. According to the original agreement, Tai Shan was to return to China two years after he was born. China had already allowed him to stay for another two and a half years beyond the initial agreement. He left D.C. for China on February 4, 2010 (on the same flight as Mei Lan from Zoo Atlanta). He moved to the Bifengxia Panda Base, in Ya'an, Sichuan, but in 2014 moved again to the Dujiangyan base of Sichuan Province's China Conservation and Research Center for the Giant Panda.

Fatherhood
Tai Shan recently made his first few steps of fatherhood by mating with Wen Yu. Tai became the father of twin cubs, a boy and a girl, by female panda Xiao Bai Tu. (This content has yet to be validated by something other than rumor.)

References

External links

 nationalzoo.si.edu, National Zoo in Washington D.C.
 Tai Shan Panda Fans (disabled)

Individual giant pandas
2005 animal births